Aguri may refer to:

Aguri (caste), Bengali Hindu agricultural caste in India
Aguri Igarashi (born 1975), female manga artist from Japan
Aguri Suzuki (born 1960), former racing driver from Japan
Aguri Suzuki F-1 Super Driving, Formula One simulator for the Super Nintendo Entertainment System
Autobacs Racing Team Aguri, joint racing project between former F1 driver Aguri Suzuki and Autobacs Seven Co
Team Aguri, Formula E race team founded by former F1 driver Aguri Suzuki
Super Aguri (disambiguation)
Aguri Uchida (born 1949), Japanese painter in the nihonga style of watercolour painting
Aguri Ōnishi (born 1997), Japanese actress
Aguri Yukimura, a fictional character from Assassination Classroom

Japanese unisex given names